Sjöbo Municipality (Sjöbo kommun) is a municipality in Skåne County in southern Sweden. Its seat is located in the town Sjöbo.

The present municipality was created in 1974 when the former market town (köping) Sjöbo was amalgamated with the surrounding rural municipalities. There are fifteen original entities within today's municipality.

Geography
The town of Sjöbo has flat terrain, with many small houses and three long straight streets stretching through it, leading to larger roads.

The northwestern part of the municipality includes the main part of Vombsjön, the largest lake of southern Scania and notable for being the water source of Malmö. Some parts of the lake belong to Lund Municipality. It offers fishing for European perch, pike, pikeperch and eel.

Localities
There are 9 urban areas (also called a Tätort or locality) in Sjöbo Municipality.

In the table they are listed according to the size of the population as of December 31, 2005. The municipal seat is in bold characters.

Activities
There are at least five (largely) authentic medieval churches from the 12th century in the municipality (in Södra Åsum, Tolånga, Björka, Blentarp and Everlöv). They are notable for not having undergone the severe restorations that many other churches in Scania suffered once the population began growing in the second half of the 19th century and Helgo Zetterwall was hired to expand on them.

Frescos which adorned the apse of Södra Åsum church and the ceilings of the churches in Everlöv and Illstrop centuries ago have been slowly uncovered in recent years.  Many similar churches had their ornamentation stripped and their paintings plastered over as part of the iconoclasm of Sweden's adoption of Lutheranism.

Apart from religious activities, there is the annual festival Sjöbo marknad, which translates to English as Sjöbo fair. It was first held in 1864, and is now held in late July, attracting some 100,000 visitors, making it one of the largest country fairs in Sweden. It has carousels and is otherwise noted for its pottery vendors and trade.

Refugee controversy

Sjöbo Municipality reached the public eye in Sweden in 1988 when, under the leadership of the  Municipal Commissioner Sven-Olle Olsson, it voted by a majority of 67% in a referendum that it would not accept foreign asylum seekers. Most other municipalities in Sweden accepted refugees that came from troubled countries such as former Yugoslavia and Iraq.

Elections
These are the results of elections held since the 1972 municipal reform. In 2014 Sjöbo Municipality became the first municipality in Sweden where the Sweden Democrats held the largest share of the votes. The high number of "missing" votes from the list from 1991 belonged to the Sjöbo Party. The Sweden Democrats numbers in 1988-1998 were not listed at a municipal level by the SCB due to the party's small size domestically.

Riksdag

Blocs

This lists the relative strength of the socialist and centre-right blocs since 1973, but parties not elected to the Riksdag are inserted as "other", including the Sweden Democrats results from 1988 to 2006, but also the Christian Democrats pre-1991 and the Greens in 1982, 1985 and 1991. The sources are identical to the table above. The coalition or government mandate marked in bold formed the government after the election. New Democracy got elected in 1991 but are still listed as "other" due to the short lifespan of the party.

References

Statistics Sweden
Info about Sjöbo Refugee question from a Nationalistic website: Sweden the extreme Way
Geography & Activities: Tourist broshure Sjöbo Kommun, (2005), available at the tourist office in Swedish, English and German.

External links

Sjöbo - Official site
Coat of arms

Municipalities of Skåne County